Trey Williams (born December 11, 1992) is an American football running back for the New Jersey Generals of the United States Football League (USFL).  He signed with the Washington Redskins as an undrafted free agent in 2015. Williams has also been a member of the Dallas Cowboys, New England Patriots, Miami Dolphins, Indianapolis Colts, Pittsburgh Steelers, San Antonio Commanders, and Seattle Dragons. He played college football at Texas A&M.

Early years
Williams attended Dekaney High School in Spring, Texas, a suburb of north Houston, where he was a three-year letterer and starting tailback for the Dekaney football team. As a sophomore, he rushed for 1,930 yards, 18 touchdowns, and was named District 13-5A Newcomer of the Year. As a junior, he had 251 carries for 2,290 yards and 20 touchdowns, receiving District 13-5A MVP and Class 5A second-team All-State honors.

As a senior, he had 447 carries for 3,890 yards, 48 touchdowns, 10 kickoff returns for 346 yards and 2 touchdowns, to go along with 6 punt returns for 113 yards and one touchdown. He helped lead Dekaney High School to its first ever state championship game, where the Wildcats beat previously undefeated Cibolo Steele High School 34–14 to win the championship. Dekaney was ranked the 23rd best team in the nation by Maxpreps, and Williams himself was listed as a 5-star recruit by 247sports. He was ranked as the 2nd best running back in the nation, the 4th best player in Texas, and the 18th overall best athlete in the nation. ESPN also called Williams the "fastest player in high school football". Trey Williams finished his high school career with 8,110 yards rushing yards (8.7-yard avg.) and 86 touchdowns. He accepted an offer from Texas A&M over offers from Alabama, Arkansas, Auburn, Baylor, Florida, Louisville, LSU, Notre Dame, Oklahoma, Oklahoma State, Oregon, Texas, and several other colleges.

Trey Williams additionally played baseball and had a .383 batting average.

College career
As a true freshman, he was the team's fourth leading rusher with 376 yards on 65 carries and 5 rushing touchdowns. 

As a sophomore, he was used as an all-purpose running back, tallying 407 rushing yards (7-yard avg.), 6 rushing touchdowns, 10 receptions for 54 receiving yards and 706 kickoff return yards for 1,167 all-purpose yards. He averaged 25.2 yards per return, including a career-long return of 97 yards against Mississippi State University. He had 83 rushing yards against the University of Arkansas. He scored two touchdowns against the University of Mississippi

As a junior, he led the team with 474 rushing yards and 6 touchdowns on 70 carries (6.8-yard avg.). He also made 14 receptions for 59 yards, 13 returns for 318 yards, including a 75-yard return against the University of Alabama. He was second on the team with 851 all-purpose yards. He rushed for 1,343 yards on 204 carries with 18 touchdowns during his college career.

He ultimately decided to forego his senior season and instead declared for the 2015 NFL Draft.

Professional career

Washington Redskins
Williams was signed as an undrafted free agent by the Washington Redskins after the 2015 NFL Draft on May 7. On his first-ever professional football carry, Williams rushed for a 38-yard gain against the Dallas Cowboys in the preseason.

Dallas Cowboys
On November 4, 2015, he was signed by the Dallas Cowboys from the Washington Redskins' practice squad to replace the recently waived Joseph Randle. He was declared inactive due to injury for four games, before being released on November 30 to make room for quarterback Kellen Moore.

New England Patriots
Williams was claimed off waivers by the New England Patriots on December 1, 2015. On December 10, 2015, Williams was waived. Williams was re-signed to New England's practice squad on December 12, 2015. On December 16, 2015, he was waived by the New England Patriots.

Miami Dolphins
On December 17, 2015, Williams was signed to the Miami Dolphins practice squad.

Indianapolis Colts
On December 21, 2015, Williams was signed off of the Dolphins practice squad by the Indianapolis Colts. He appeared in two games, where he rushed for 12 yards on two carries. Williams was released by the Colts on August 29, 2016.

Pittsburgh Steelers
On February 14, 2017, Williams was signed by the Pittsburgh Steelers. He appeared in one game in the preseason and returned a punt for a 64-yard touchdown. He was waived on September 2, 2017.

Toronto Argonauts
On October 9, 2017, Williams signed a practice roster agreement with the Toronto Argonauts of the Canadian Football League and was released a week later.

Dallas Cowboys (second stint)
On November 2, 2017, Williams was signed to the Dallas Cowboys' practice squad for running back depth after the reinstatement of Ezekiel Elliott's 6-game suspension. He was promoted to the active roster on November 26, 2017, where he appeared on special teams. On December 18, 2017, he was waived by the Cowboys and re-signed to the practice squad. 

He signed a reserve/future contract with the Cowboys on January 1, 2018. He was waived on September 1.

San Antonio Commanders
On January 2, 2019, Williams signed with the San Antonio Commanders of the Alliance of American Football. He was a backup behind Kenneth Farrow until the league folded in April 2019. Although he missed several games due to an undisclosed shoulder injury, he posted 40 carries for 205 yards (5.12-yard avg.) and one touchdown.

Seattle Dragons
In October 2019, Williams was a number one pick by the Seattle Dragons via the 2020 XFL Draft. In March, amid the COVID-19 pandemic, the league announced that it would be cancelling the rest of the season. He had 34 carries for 127 yards (third on the team) and a touchdown, additionally catching 8 passes for 44 yards and another touchdown. He had his contract terminated when the league suspended operations on April 10, 2020.

Calgary Stampeders
Williams signed with the Calgary Stampeders of the CFL on March 19, 2021. He was released at the end of training camp on July 29, 2021.

Toronto Argonauts (second stint)
On August 10, 2021, Williams signed with the Toronto Argonauts. He was quietly released in October 2021.

New Jersey Generals
On February 22, 2022, Trey Williams was drafted in the USFL's inaugural draft to the New Jersey Generals. Williams would have several starts throughout the season and would go onto rush for 579 yards and 2 touchdowns on 118 carries, with 126 receiving yards and one more touchdown. He ran for a 62-yard touchdown against the Philadelphia Stars, in a play that would be named the USFL's Play of the Week.

References

External links
Texas A&M bio

1992 births
Living people
Players of American football from Houston
Players of Canadian football from Houston
American football running backs
American football return specialists
Texas A&M Aggies football players
Washington Redskins players
Dallas Cowboys players
New England Patriots players
Miami Dolphins players
Indianapolis Colts players
Pittsburgh Steelers players
San Antonio Commanders players
Seattle Dragons players
Calgary Stampeders players
Toronto Argonauts players
New Jersey Generals (2022) players